Hrvatin Gudelj (born 21 November 1978) is a Croatian retired footballer.

References

External links
 
 

1978 births
Living people
Sportspeople from Imotski
Association football forwards
Croatian footballers
NK Imotski players
Borussia Dortmund II players
HNK Hajduk Split players
NK Zadar players
HNK Šibenik players
FK Atlantas players
Croatian Football League players
First Football League (Croatia) players
A Lyga players
Croatian expatriate footballers
Expatriate footballers in Germany
Croatian expatriate sportspeople in Germany
Expatriate footballers in Lithuania
Croatian expatriate sportspeople in Lithuania